In mathematical physics, in particular electromagnetism, the Riemann–Silberstein vector or Weber vector named after Bernhard Riemann, Heinrich Martin Weber and Ludwik Silberstein, (or sometimes ambiguously called the "electromagnetic field") is a complex vector that combines the electric field E and the magnetic field B.

History
Heinrich Martin Weber published the fourth edition of "The partial differential equations of mathematical physics according to Riemann's lectures" in two volumes (1900 and 1901). However, Weber pointed out in the preface of the first volume (1900) that this fourth edition was completely rewritten based on his own lectures, not Riemann's, and that the reference to "Riemann's lectures" only remained in the title because the overall concept remained the same and that he continued the work in Riemann's spirit. In the second volume (1901, §138, p. 348), Weber demonstrated how to consolidate Maxwell’s equations using . The real and imaginary components of the equation

are an interpretation of Maxwell’s equations without charges or currents. It was independently rediscovered and further developed by Ludwik Silberstein in 1907.

Definition
Given an electric field E and a magnetic field B defined on a common region of spacetime, the Riemann–Silberstein vector is

where  is the speed of light, with some authors preferring to multiply the right hand side by an overall constant , where  is the permittivity of free space.  It is analogous to the electromagnetic tensor F, a 2-vector used in the covariant formulation of classical electromagnetism.

In Silberstein's formulation, i was defined as the imaginary unit, and F was defined as a complexified 3-dimensional vector field, called a bivector field.

Application

The Riemann–Silberstein vector is used as a point of reference in the geometric algebra formulation of electromagnetism.  Maxwell's four equations in vector calculus reduce to one equation in the algebra of physical space:

Expressions for the fundamental invariants and the energy density and momentum density also take on simple forms:

where S is the Poynting vector.

The Riemann–Silberstein vector is used for an exact matrix representations of Maxwell's equations in an inhomogeneous medium with sources.

Photon wave function
In 1996 contribution to quantum electrodynamics, Iwo Bialynicki-Birula used the Riemann–Silberstein vector as the basis for an approach to the photon, noting that it is a "complex vector-function of space coordinates r and time t that adequately describes the quantum state of a single photon". To put the Riemann–Silberstein vector in contemporary parlance, a transition is made:
With the advent of spinor calculus that superseded the quaternionic  calculus, the transformation properties of the Riemann-Silberstein vector have become even more transparent ... a symmetric second-rank spinor.
Bialynicki-Birula acknowledges that the photon wave function is a controversial concept and that it cannot have all the properties of Schrödinger wave functions of non-relativistic wave mechanics. Yet defense is mounted on the basis of practicality: it is useful for describing quantum states of excitation of a free field, electromagnetic fields acting on a medium, vacuum excitation of virtual positron-electron pairs, and presenting the photon among quantum particles that do have wave functions.

Schrödinger equation for the photon and the Heisenberg uncertainty relations

Multiplying the two time dependent Maxwell equations by  
the  Schrödinger equation for photon in the vacuum is given by

where  is the vector built from the spin of the length 1 matrices  generating full infinitesimal rotations of 3-spinor particle. One may therefore notice that the 
Hamiltonian in the Schrödinger equation of the photon is the projection of its spin 1 onto 
its momentum since the normal momentum operator appears there from combining parts of rotations.

In contrast to the electron wave function the modulus square of the wave function of the photon 
(Riemann-Silbertein vector) is not dimensionless and must be multiplied by the "local photon
wavelength" with the proper power to give dimensionless expression to normalize i.e. 
it is normalized in the exotic way with the integral kernel

The two residual Maxwell equations are only constraints i.e. 

and they are automatically fulfilled all time if only fulfilled at the initial time 
, i.e.

where 
is any complex  vector field with the non-vanishing  rotation, or 
it is a vector potential for the Riemann–Silberstein vector.

While having the wave function of the photon one can estimate the uncertainty relations 
for the photon. It shows up that photons are "more quantum" than the electron while their 
uncertainties of position and the momentum are higher.
of the position length vector.

We will use the general relation for the uncertainty for the operators 
 
We want the uncertainty relation for  i.e. for the operators
 
 

The first step is to find the auxiliary operator  such that this relation
can be used directly. First we  make  the same trick for  that Dirac made to calculate the 
square root of the Klein-Gordon operator to get the Dirac equation:
 
where  are matrices from the Dirac equation:
 
 
Therefore, we have 
 
Because the spin matrices 1 are  only  to calculate the commutator 
in the same space we approximate the spin matrices
by angular momentum matrices of the particle with the length  while 
dropping the multiplying  since the resulting Maxwell equations in 4 dimensions would look too artificial
to the original (alternatively we can keep the original  factors but normalize the new 4-spinor 
to 2 as 4 scalar particles normalized to 1/2):
 
We can now readily calculate the commutator while calculating commutators 
of  matrixes and scaled  and noticing that the symmetric Gaussian state 
 is annihilating in average the terms containing mixed variable like
.
Calculating 9 commutators (mixed may be zero by Gaussian example and the  since those matrices are counter-diagonal) and estimating 

we obtain 

or  

which is much more than for the mass particle in 3 dimensions that is 

and therefore photons turn out to be particles 
 times  or almost 3 times "more quantum" than particles with the mass like electrons.

References

Electromagnetism
Geometric algebra
Bernhard Riemann